The Borough of Wellingborough was from 1974 to 2021 a non-metropolitan district and borough in Northamptonshire, England.  It was named after Wellingborough, its main town, but also included surrounding rural areas.

The local council preferred to call itself the 'Borough Council of Wellingborough' rather than the more usual form 'Wellingborough Borough Council'.

The borough covered almost the same area as the Wellingborough constituency. It was formed on 1 April 1974, under the Local Government Act 1972, by a merger of the borough of Wellingborough with Wellingborough Rural District.

The borough bordered the districts of South Northamptonshire, Northampton, Kettering, Daventry and East Northamptonshire, as well as Milton Keynes in Buckinghamshire, and Bedford in Bedfordshire.

Abolition and replacement
In March 2018, following suspension of the County Council arising from its becoming insolvent, due to financial and cultural mismanagement by the cabinet and officers, the then Secretary of State for Local Government, Sajid Javid, sent commissioner Max Caller into the council, who recommended the county council and all district and borough councils in the county be abolished, and replaced by two unitary authorities, one covering the West, and one the North of the county. These proposals were approved in April 2019. It meant that the districts of Daventry, Northampton and South Northamptonshire were merged to form a new unitary authority called West Northamptonshire, whilst the second unitary authority North Northamptonshire consists of Corby, East Northamptonshire, Kettering and Wellingborough districts. These new authorities came into being on 1 April 2021. Elections for the new authorities were due to be held on 7 May 2020, but were delayed due to the COVID-19 pandemic.

Concurrent with these changes, the unparished area of Wellingborough was established as a civil parish and gained a Town Council.

Settlements and parishes

Other than Wellingborough itself the borough included:

Bozeat
Earls Barton
Easton Maudit
Ecton
Finedon
Great Doddington
Great Harrowden
Grendon
Hardwick
Irchester 
Isham
Little Harrowden, 
Little Irchester
Mears Ashby
Orlingbury
Strixton
Sywell
Wilby
Wollaston

Political control
See Wellingborough Borough Council elections

Arms

References

 
Former non-metropolitan districts
Non-metropolitan districts of Northamptonshire
Former boroughs in England
2021 disestablishments in England
North Northamptonshire